Azad is a movie theater located in Johnson Road, Dhaka, Bangladesh. Azad is one of the oldest movie theaters and the fourth oldest movie theater in the capital of the country.

History
In 1929, Mukul Banerjee, the then zamindar of Murapara, established a movie theater named "Mukul Talkies" in Old Dhaka. R. C. Majumdar, the then vice chancellors of Dhaka University, inaugurated the movie theater. On the opening day, Mukul Talkies screened the film The Last Kiss, which is said to be the first silent film produced in Dhaka. Yar Mohammad Khan rented Mukul Theatre to hold the Awami League council meeting in the early in 1950s. Mukul Talkies was renamed Azad Cinema in 1964 after it was bought by Sher Ali Ramji, a Bollywood film producer. Ten years later, the ownership of the movie theater was transferred to A.U.M. Khalilur Rahman. On 23 December 2013, a fire, caused by electric short circuit, broke out in the movie theater, destroying much of its furniture.

Features
Azad usually shows old films. It has 1100 seats. Azad has three shows daily.

Controversy
Azad is popular for B-grade and adult film posters. Besides, there are allegations of involvement of drug addicts and people involved in anti-social activities with this movie theater. Its manager claimed that the posters were asked by the film distributors to put up. But he denied the second allegation.

References

Old Dhaka
Cinemas in Dhaka
1929 establishments in British India